Parvimonas micra is a Gram positive anaerobic coccus which is frequently isolated from dental plaque in patients with chronic periodontitis. It is the only species in its genus, and is a common constituent of mixed anaerobic infections such as intra-abdominal abscess. It has rarely been implicated as a sole pathogen in septic arthritis, osteomyelitis and discitis associated with recent dental procedures.

References

External links 
 Type strain of Parvimonas micra at BacDive -  the Bacterial Diversity Metadatabase

Medically important anaerobes
Bacillota